Ian Robert George Stephen (19 November 1916 – 13 September 2000) was a South African rower who mostly competed in single sculls. He won a bronze medal at the 1950 British Empire Games and competed at the 1948 and 1952 Summer Olympics, finishing fifth in 1952.

References

1916 births
2000 deaths
South African male rowers
Rowers at the 1952 Summer Olympics
Rowers at the 1948 Summer Olympics
Olympic rowers of South Africa
Rowers at the 1950 British Empire Games
Commonwealth Games bronze medallists for South Africa
Commonwealth Games medallists in rowing
20th-century South African people
Medallists at the 1950 British Empire Games